Six tennis events were contested at the 1908 Summer Olympics in London, United Kingdom. Indoor tennis events, on what were officially called 'covered courts', were held for the first time, along with the usual outdoor events. Women's events were contested, with women's singles (but not women's doubles or mixed doubles) and indoor women's singles. The indoor events were held at the covered courts of the Queen's Club and began on 6 May 1908, ahead of the official start of the Games while the outdoor tournament was played on grass courts at the All England Lawn Tennis and Croquet Club at Worple Road from 6 July through 11 July 1908. In total 50 players, 40 men and 10 women, competed. Five nations made their tennis debuts, while five more returned to competition for a total of ten nations. Two players, Les Poidevin and Wimbledon champion Anthony Wilding were nominated for Australasia but through administrative bungling they were not entered.

Medal summary

Events

Outdoor

Indoor

Medal table

Participating nations
50 players from 10 nations competed.

See also
 Jeu de paume at the 1908 Summer Olympics (real tennis)

References

External links
 International Olympic Committee medal database
 
 ITF, 2008 Olympic Tennis Event Media Guide

 
1908 Summer Olympics events
1908
Olympics
1908 Olympics
Tennis in London